Ralph Dison or Ralfe Dyson (died 1628) was a servant of the English royal family.

Dison was under-keeper of the royal palace and wardrobe at Oatlands. His annual fee was £12. The keeper was John Trevor (1563–1630).

His name appears in the inventories of Anne of Denmark. He made a list of six paintings to be sent to the queen's gallery at Hampton Court with a servant of John Whynyard, yeoman of the king's beds, and oversaw the return of red velvet hangings to Whitehall Palace and a folding Chinese screen to Somerset House.

Ralph Dison died before 1628. The executor of his will was his widow Phoebe Alexander, the daughter of a London ironmonger Ralph Cannynge.

The next under-keeper at Oatlands was John Griffith.

References

Household of Anne of Denmark
1628 deaths